The Scaredy Cats is a 2003 children's picture book by Barbara Bottner, and illustrated by Victoria Chess. It was first published by HarperCollins Publishers.

Plot
The Scaredy Cat parents wakes up in the morning, they can't function because they are scared of things that could possibly happen. The Scaredy Cats live through a day of fear.

Reception
Martha V. Parravano, of Horn Book Magazine reviewed the book saying:  Diane Roback, of Publishers Weekly reviewed the book saying:  Trevelyn E. Jones, of School Library Journal reviewed the book saying:

References

2003 children's books
American picture books
Works about fear
American children's books
Books about cats